Year 1466 (MCDLXVI) was a common year starting on Wednesday (link will display the full calendar) of the Julian calendar. It is one of eight years (CE) to contain each Roman numeral once (1000(M)+(-100(C)+500(D))+50(L)+10(X)+5(V)+1(I) = 1466).

Events 
 The Kingdom of Georgia collapses into anarchy, and fragments into rival states of Kartli, Kakheti, Imereti, Samtskhe-Saatabago and a number of principalities; this breakup is finalised in 1490, when Constantine II of Georgia has to recognize his rival monarchies.
 The Mentelin Bible, the first printed German language Bible, is produced.
 Louis XI of France introduces silk weaving to Lyon.
 The first known shop specialising in eyeglasses opens in Strasbourg.
 The second largest bell of Saint Peter's Church, Fritzlar in Hesse is cast by Meister Goswin aus Fritzlar.

Births 
 February 11 – Elizabeth of York, queen of Henry VII of England (d. 1503)
 May 22 – Marino Sanuto the Younger, Italian historian (d. 1536)
 June 18 – Ottaviano Petrucci, Italian music printer (d. 1539)
 July 5 – Giovanni Sforza, Italian noble (d. 1510)
 August 10 – Francesco II Gonzaga, Marquess of Mantua (d. 1519)
 September 9 – Ashikaga Yoshitane, Japanese shōgun (d. 1523)
 October 28 – Erasmus, Dutch philosopher (d. 1536)
 November 16 – Francesco Cattani da Diacceto, Florentine philosopher (d. 1522)
 November 26 – Edward Hastings, 2nd Baron Hastings, English noble (d. 1506)
 November 30 – Andrea Doria, Genoese condottiero and admiral (d. 1560)
 Probable – Moctezuma II, Aztec Tlatoani (ruler) of Tenochtitlán (modern Mexico City), 1502–1520, son of Axayacatl  (d. 1520)

Deaths 
 February 23 – Girishawardhana Dyah Suryawikrama, 9th Maharaja of Majapahit
 March 6 – Alvise Loredan, Venetian admiral and statesman (b. 1393)
 March 8 – Francesco I Sforza, Duke of Milan (b. 1401)
 August – Hacı I Giray, first ruler of the Crimean Khanate (b. 1397)
 October 30 – Johann Fust, German printer (b. c. 1400)
 December 13 – Donatello, Italian artist (b. 1386)
 Date unknown
 Barbara Manfredi, Italian noblewoman (b. 1444)
 Isotta Nogarola, Italian writer and intellectual  (b. 1418)
 Nicolaus Zacharie, Italian composer (b. c. 1400)

References